Alfred George Tuppin (17 December 1911 – 20 July 2003) was an English cricketer. Tuppin was a right-handed batsman who bowled right-arm medium pace. He was born at Brighton, Sussex.

Tuppin made his first-class debut for Sussex against Lancashire in the 1935 County Championship at the County Ground, Hove. He made 22 further first-class appearances for the county, the last of which came against Nottinghamshire in the 1939 County Championship. Tuppin's role within the Sussex team was a bowler, with him 56 wickets in his nine first-class matches, at an average of 29.03, with best figures of 5/30. He took four five wicket hauls, with his best figures coming against Worcestershire in 1937. With the bat, he scored 294 runs at a batting average of 11.76, with a high score of 31 not out.

He died at Haywards Heath, Sussex, on 20 July 2003.

References

External links
Alfred Tuppin at ESPNcricinfo
Alfred Tuppin at CricketArchive

1911 births
2003 deaths
Sportspeople from Brighton
English cricketers
Sussex cricketers